Mike Anderson (born August 15, 1961) is a former professional Canadian football offensive lineman who played 12 seasons in the Canadian Football League for the Saskatchewan Roughriders.  He was selected by the Roughriders as a territorial exemption to the draft. He was named CFL All-Star in the 1994 CFL season, a year after he was released due to salary cap reduction, but then later re-signed.

References

1961 births
Living people
Canadian football offensive linemen
Sportspeople from Regina, Saskatchewan
Players of Canadian football from Saskatchewan
Saskatchewan Roughriders players
San Diego State Aztecs football players